El Soberano or Soberano Jr. (born August 12, 1993 in Torreón, Coahuila, Mexico) is a Mexican luchador enmascarado, or masked professional wrestler currently working for the Mexican professional wrestling promotion Consejo Mundial de Lucha Libre (CMLL) portraying a tecnico ("Good guy") wrestling character. Soberano Jr.'s real name is not a matter of public record, as is often the case with masked wrestlers in Mexico where their private lives are kept a secret from the wrestling fans. He is a third-generation wrestler, son of Euforia and grandson of Pablo Moreno Román, known under the ring name El Soberano. Soberano is Spanish for "Sovereign".

In his career he has won the 2013 Torneo Sangre Nueva, the 2017 La Copa Junior Nuevo Valores and 2017 Torneo Gran Alternativa tournaments and is a former holder of the Mexican National Welterweight Championship. Alongside tag team partner Star Jr. (collectively known as Los Principes del Aire) he has won the masks of Ramstein and Cholo.

Professional wrestling career
Soberano Jr. was trained both by his grandfather Pablo Moreno Román, better known by his ring name Soberano and his father, best known under the ring name Euforia. He made his professional wrestling debut at the age of only 13, working on the local independent circuit in Torreón, Coahuila. During the early parts of his career he competed as El Nieto del Soberano ("The Grandson of Soberano") but later changed his name to Soberano Jr. or El Soberano Jr., the same ring name used by his father.

Consejo Mundial de Lucha Libre (2010–present)
He began training in Consejo Mundial de Lucha Libre (CMLL) wrestling school and even competed in CMLL's 2010 Bodybuilding contest, before he had made his in-ring debut for the company, he placed third in the beginners category. He would not make his in-ring debut for CMLL until six months later, on June 7, 2011 where he teamed up with Trueno losing to Semental and Apocalipsis in a match at Arena Mexico. In March, 2012 Soberano Jr. was one of the participants in the Torneo Sangre Nueva("The New Blood Tournament") that featured 16 wrestlers classified as rookies, or at least rookie characters. Soberano Jr. competed in the "Block A" torneo cibernetico, eight-man elimination match and was eliminated as the third man, 10:12 into the match when he was pinned by Stigma. During a match on the September 7, 2012 Super Viernes between the tag team of Soberano Jr. and Horus and Camorra and Inquisidor, Soberano Jr. was injured due to a mistimed move and was carried out of the arena on a stretcher. Soberano Jr. would not wrestle again for over a month before making a full recovery. On February 26, 2013 Soberano Jr. outlasted Camaleón, Stigma, Horus, Hombre Bala Jr., Akuma, Espanto Jr., Herodes Jr., Cholo and Bobby Zavala to qualify for the finals of the 2013 Torneo Sangre Nueva.  Soberano Jr. defeated Taurus, two falls to one to win the 2013 Sangre Nueva tournament. In late March 2013 Soberano Jr. was announced as one of the Novatos, or rookies, in the 2013 Torneo Gran Alternativa, or "Great Alternative tournament". The Gran Alternativa pairs a rookie with an experienced wrestler for a tag team tournament. Soberano Jr. was teamed up with veteran wrestler La Sombra and competed in Block B that took place on the April 19, 2013 Super Viernes show. The team defeated Herodes Jr. and El Terrible in the first round, Sensei and Rush in the second round, but lost to Bobby Zavala and Rey Escorpión in the semi-finals. On April 7, 2013 Soberano Jr. worked his first major CMLL event when he teamed up with Metatrón to defeat Espanto Jr. and Guerrero Negro Jr. in the opening match of the Arena Coliseo 70th Anniversary Show.

In late 2014 Soberano Jr. and Star Jr. started an alliance as "Los Principes del Ring" ("The Ring Princes"). They were involved in a feud with Ramstein and Cholo, which ended up in a Lucha de Apuestas, or mask vs. mask match, on January 6, 2015, which Los Principes won, taking the masks of both of their opponents. In January 2017, Soberano Jr. made his Japanese debut by taking part in Fantastica Mania 2017, the annual tour co-produced by CMLL and New Japan Pro-Wrestling (NJPW). On April 14, 2017 Soberano Jr. outlasted El Hijo del Signo, Oro Jr., Espanto Jr., The Panther, Canelo Casas, Drone and El Cuatrero to qualify for the finals of the 2017 La Copa Junior Nuevo Valores tournament, a tournament for second or third-generation luchadors. Two weeks later he defeated Sansón to win the whole tournament. On May 13, 2017 Soberano Jr. defeated Rey Cometa to win the Mexican National Welterweight Championship, his first CMLL championship. In June 2017 Soberano teamed up with veteran wrestler Carístico for the 2017 Gran Alternativa ("Great Alternative") tournament. The duo defeated the teams of Ángel de Oro and Oro Jr., Flyer and Volador Jr., Canelo Casas and Negro Casas to qualify for the finals. On June 16 the two defeated Sansón and Último Guerrero to win the 2017 Gran Alternativa tournament. Soberano Jr. would compete in the 2018 Super Junior Tag League with Volador Jr. They finished with a 2-5 record, failing to advance to the finals.

Championships and accomplishments
Consejo Mundial de Lucha Libre
CMLL World Middleweight Championship (1 time)
Mexican National Welterweight Championship (1 time)
Torneo Gran Alternativa (2017) with Carístico
Torneo Sangre Nueva (2013)
La Copa Junior (Nuevo Valores 2017)
Copa Dinastías (2022) - with Euforia
 Pro Wrestling Illustrated
 Ranked No. 242 of the top 500 singles wrestlers in the PWI 500 in 2021

Luchas de Apuestas record

References

1993 births
Living people
Masked wrestlers
Mexican male professional wrestlers
Unidentified wrestlers
Professional wrestlers from Coahuila
People from Torreón
21st-century professional wrestlers
CMLL World Middleweight Champions
Mexican National Welterweight Champions